June Brewster (August 8, 1913 – November 2, 1995) was an American film actress of the 1930s.

Selected filmography
 The Sport Parade (1932)
 Goldie Gets Along (1933)
 Meet the Baron (1933) 
 Headline Shooter (1933)
 Flying Devils (1933) 
 Hips, Hips, Hooray! (1934)
 Melody Cruise (1933)
 The Case Against Mrs. Ames (1936) 
 Partners in Crime (1937)
 Blonde Trouble (1937) 
 The Lady Escapes (1937) 
 Love Is a Headache (1938)
 Thanks for the Memory (1938)

References

External links

1913 births
1995 deaths
American film actresses
Actresses from New York (state)
Actresses from Las Vegas
20th-century American actresses